Negage Airport  is an airport serving Negage, a town and municipality in Uíge Province in Angola. It was formerly a Portuguese military airbase.

The Negage non-directional beacon (Ident NG) is reportedly on the airfield.

History
The present airport was built by the Portuguese Air Force, being inaugurated on 7 February 1961, as the Aerodrome-Base nº 3 (AB3, Aeródromo-Base nº 3). The base had an important role during the Angolan War of Independence. Besides the main airfield at Negage, the AB3 also controlled two satellite maneuver airfields, one at Maquela do Zombo (AM31) and the other at Toto (AM32).

See also
 List of airports in Angola
 Transport in Angola

References

External links
 
OurAirports - Negage
OpenStreetMap - Negage

Airports in Angola